Hasty pudding is a pudding or porridge of grains cooked in milk or water. In the United States, it often refers specifically to a version made primarily with ground ("Indian") corn, and it is mentioned in the lyrics of "Yankee Doodle", a traditional American song of  the eighteenth century.

Terminology
Since at least the 16th century, a dish called hasty pudding has been found in British cuisine made of wheat flour that has been cooked in boiling milk or water until it reaches the consistency of a thick batter or an oatmeal porridge.  It was a staple dish for the English for centuries. The earliest known recipes for hasty pudding date to the 17th century. There are three examples in Robert May's The Accomplisht Cook. The first is made with flour, cream, raisins, currants and butter, the second recipe is for a boiled pudding and the third includes grated bread, eggs and sugar.

Hasty pudding was used by Hannah Glasse as a term for batter or oatmeal porridge in The Art of Cookery (1747). It is also mentioned in Samuel Johnson's Dictionary of 1755 as a combination of either milk and flour or oatmeal and water. The recipe is also found in The Compleat Housewife where it is made with grated penny loaf, cream, egg yolks, sack (or orange blossom water) and sugar.

American cuisine
Indian pudding is a traditional American dessert, "a cold-weather classic" in the cuisine of New England. It was commonplace in the colonial era and enjoyed a revival as part of Thanksgiving Day celebrations in the late 19th century. It was found in most American cookbooks before 1900. The 20th century's commercial puddings with their industrially perfect smooth consistency displaced Indian pudding, and its cooking time had little appeal for the modern home cook. It is still associated with autumn holidays and occasionally revived by restaurants. It is usually served warm and sometimes accompanied by vanilla ice cream or whipped cream.

Colonial United States

Seventeenth-century English colonists brought hasty pudding to North America and transformed it completely. Lacking wheat, they substituted cornmeal, a grain they learned to cultivate from the indigenous peoples, which led to the new name Indian pudding, derived from their name for cornmeal, Indian meal. They substituted milk, which was plentiful, for water and added locally available sweeteners, either molasses or maple syrup, and spices when available, typically cinnamon and ground ginger. Other traditional ingredients include butter and eggs for a smoother consistency and raisins and nuts for flavor and contrasting texture. Finally, Indian pudding was baked in a slow oven for several hours, transforming its texture from the porridge-like quality of hasty pudding to a smoother texture more typical of custard puddings. According to Kathleen Wall, Plimoth Plantation's expert on colonial cooking, "The longer it cooks, the more liquid the gritty cornmeal absorbs, and the more it absorbs, the smoother the texture of your pudding." 

In 1643 Roger Williams called the dish "nasaump": "Nasaump, a kind of meale pottage, unpartch'd. From this the English call their samp, which is the Indian corne, beaten and boild, and eaten hot or cold, with milke or butter, which are mercies beyond the Natives plaine water, and which is a dish exceeding wholesome for the English bodies."

Antebellum period
Eliza Leslie, an influential American cookbook author of the early 19th century, includes a recipe for flour hasty pudding in her 1840 Directions for Cookery, In Its Various Branches, and calls the corn type "Indian mush". She calls an oatmeal version burgoo.  She stresses the need for slow cooking rather than haste, and also recommends the use of a special mush-stick for stirring to prevent lumps.  (This mush-stick is perhaps related to the spurtle, or the pudding stick of the nursery rhyme beating.)

Catherine Beecher's recipe:

Wet up the Indian meal in cold water, till there are no lumps, stir it gradually into boiling water which has been salted, till so thick that the stick will stand in it. Boil slowly, and so as not to burn, stirring often. Two or three hours' boiling is needed. Pour it into a broad, deep dish, let it grow cold, cut it into slices half an inch thick, flour them, and fry them on a griddle with a little lard, or bake them in a stone oven.

"Yankee Doodle" and other literary references
Hasty pudding is referred to in a verse of the early American song "Yankee Doodle":

It is also referenced in Louisa May Alcott's Little Men (1871): "on their garden plot, Emil and Franz devoted themselves to corn, and had a jolly little husking in the barn, after which they took their corn to the mill, and came proudly home with meal enough to supply the family with hasty pudding and Johnny cake for a long time."

Similar dishes

In the recipe for the Brazilian pudding , sweet corn grains are taken raw together with milk and most often coconut milk to a blender until uniformly liquid; cinnamon powder is sprinkled at the end. When boiled wrapped in corn husks is called pamonha.

Polenta is the savory Italian version of hasty pudding, with maize/corn substituted for the wheat originally used by the Romans.

See also

 List of puddings
 List of maize dishes
 List of porridges
 Samp

References

Sources
 Evan Jones, American Food: The Gastronomic Story (1981) Viking Books 
 Jonathan Norton Leonard, American Cooking: New England (1970) Time-Life Books

External links
Miss Leslie's Directions for Cookery, In Its Various Branches
Cooks.com's Recipe for Hasty Pudding

Puddings
American desserts
New England cuisine
Porridges
Maize dishes
Historical foods
Cuisine of the Thirteen Colonies